František Pürgl is a Paralympic athlete from the Czech Republic competing mainly in category F54  events.

František has competed in two paralympics, in 2000 and in 2004 both times competing in the javelin and discus.  It is in the later event he has won both his medals a silver in 2000 and a bronze in 2004.

References

Paralympic athletes of the Czech Republic
Athletes (track and field) at the 2004 Summer Paralympics
Paralympic bronze medalists for the Czech Republic
Living people
Medalists at the 2000 Summer Paralympics
Medalists at the 2004 Summer Paralympics
Athletes (track and field) at the 2000 Summer Paralympics
Year of birth missing (living people)
Paralympic medalists in athletics (track and field)
Czech male discus throwers